= Town is Dead =

Play by Philip McMahon

- Original language: English
- Written by: Phillip McMahon and Raymond Scannell
- Characters: Ellen; Keyboards; Katarina; Rachel; Will; Harp
- Setting: June 2, 2016

Premiere
- Place: Abbey Theatre

Town is Dead is a 2016 play by Phillip McMahon and Raymond Scannell.

The play portrays a working-class woman in her late 60s living in Dublin and forced to move. This pulls her back into her memories of a life of enduring deprivation, violence, addiction and tragedy. Her grim life story is expounded through dialogue, song, movement and music.
